Mandrill is a fictional mutant supervillain appearing in American comic books published by Marvel Comics.

Publication history

Mandrill first appeared in Shanna the She-Devil #4 (June 1973). He was created by writer Carole Seuling and artist Ross Andru. Steve Gerber dialogued his first appearance and wrote several subsequent appearances, but denied having a hand in the character's creation, saying he was all Seuling's.

Fictional character biography
Jerome Beechman was the son of Frederic Beechman, a physicist at Los Alamos National Laboratory in New Mexico, and Margaret Beechman. Before conceiving his son, an explosion breached the facility's nuclear reactor, bombarding Frederic and a cleaning woman with radiation. When Jerome was born a year later, he possessed black skin (despite both of his parents being Caucasian) and tufts of body hair. Jerome was despised by his family because of his freakish appearance, and when he was ten his father drove him out into the New Mexico desert and abandoned him.

While wandering the desert, Jerome encountered Nekra Sinclair, the daughter of the cleaning woman who had been bombarded by radiation in the same accident that had affected Beecham's father. Although her parents were black, she had been born albino white and had developed vampiric features. For six years they lived by theft and scavenging until they were attacked by a lynch mob that thought they were monsters. The hatred triggered by the attack manifested Beecham's ability to control women with his pheromones, as well as Sinclair's powers, which the two used to kill some of their attackers and escape the rest.

Now possessing a more monkey-like appearance, Beecham became a professional criminal and took the name Mandrill. Traveling to Africa, the two plotted to overthrow and seize control of three small nations through a cult of personality powered by the Mandrill's pheromone ability. They intended to create a society free of the values that had led them to be rejected when they were young. This effort was thwarted by Shanna the She-Devil. After their battle, Beecham and Sinclair were captured by S.H.I.E.L.D. The two escaped, kidnapping Shanna's father in the process and eventually killing him.

For their next plot, they acted as political subversives, using the Mandrill's powers to raise Black Spectre, a cult of black women committed to overthrowing America. As leader of Black Spectre, he battled the Thing and Daredevil. Alongside Nekra and Black Spectre, he attacked the Empire State Building and battled Daredevil, the Black Widow, and Shanna.  Mandrill and his allies were ultimately defeated on the White House lawn by the heroes. Though Nekra was captured, Mandrill escaped the authorities.

Mandrill raised yet another army of women called Fem-Force. He also recruited the Mutant Force to aid him in his takeover of the United States and attacked an Air Force base in Colorado. This adventure was brought to an end by the Defenders. Mutant Force was captured. Mandrill led Fem-Force against the Indian Point Energy Center, where his parents were employed. He fought the Defenders again, but in the end Mandrill was defeated when he was shot by his own mother. Surviving, he escaped with the aid of some Fem-Force members.

Mandrill has made no secret of his misogyny. He has often taken sexual advantage of his slaves. He married some of his slaves, becoming illegally polygamous. In the pages of Daredevil, it was alluded that he had made the Black Widow one of his many conquests.

Mandrill attempted to avenge the death of Nekra in Los Angeles, California by attacking the Grim Reaper. Mandrill was apparently slain, but he somehow survived and was later incarcerated in New York's experimental "Ant-Hill" prison, where all prisoners were reduced in size by Hank Pym's Pym particles. An escape attempt was thwarted by She-Hulk. Mandrill was incarcerated on The Raft, where he escaped during The New Avengers #1 to join Crossfire's mind-controlling team of villains in Spider-Man: Breakout. He was captured by Spider-Man in the pages of Marvel's February romance specials. Mandrill is one of the comparative few mutants who retained their powers in the wake of Marvel's Decimation event.

The Hood hired Mandrill as part of his criminal organization to take advantage of the split in the superhero community caused by the Superhuman Registration Act. He helped them fight the New Avengers but was defeated by Doctor Strange.

When Alyosha Kravinoff (the son of Kraven the Hunter) began collecting a zoo of animal themed superhumans some time after the "Civil War" storyline, Mandrill is clearly seen in one of the cages. He later attacked the Punisher, who defeated him with a series of punches. Mandrill's left eye was dislodged in the attack.

During the "Secret Invasion" storyline, Mandrill was one of many prisoners who escaped from The Raft prison for supervillains. He assists with the Hood's group allies themselves with the heroes to fight a Skrull invasion force in Central Park. As seen in flashbacks, the Hood has used his powers to free his men and clear their group of Skrull infiltrators.

During the Dark Reign storyline, Mandrill joins with the Hood's gang in an attack on the New Avengers, who were expecting the Dark Avengers instead. Mandrill is later seen conferring with the Hood regarding procuring the zombie virus. He argues with the Hood that the virus is too dangerous, but the Hood is compelled by Dormammu to procure the virus anyway. Mandrill is seen to be among the new recruits for Camp HAMMER. Mandrill is with the Hood's crime syndicate when Hood tells them that they are now freelancing agents of Norman Osborn.

Mandrill assists Griffin in attacking Spider-Man and Spider-Woman, and takes control of Spider-Woman. Spider-Man webs Mandrill in his face and Spider-Woman resists his control and blasts the Mandrill in the mouth. He is seen during the battle of Camp: HAMMER, until the Hood orders him to teleport to aid Osborn in Siege of Asgard. After the battle ends, Mandrill is arrested along with other members of the Hood's gang.

During the "Hunted" storyline, Mandrill is among the animal-themed superhumans that were captured by Taskmaster and Black Ant for Kraven the Hunter's Great Hunt. After most of the animal-themed superheroes regrouped, it was mentioned by Spider-Man that Mandrill was killed amidst the chaos caused by the Hunter-Bots.

Later Mandrill was seen to be one of the prisoners in the prison during Captain America's stay. During the escape orchestrated by Captain America, Mandrill helped the Captain open a hatch, however when the Captain told the prisoners to, Mandrill questioned his orders only to be shot by a prison guard's stun blaster.

Powers and abilities
The Mandrill is a mutant who exudes pheromones that give him the chemically-based ability to attract and enslave women. Certain women of heightened willpower can resist his control. A mild electrical shock can release victims from his control. His power is ineffective against males. He also has superhuman strength, speed, agility, dexterity, flexibility, reflexes, coordination, balance and endurance comparable to that of a great ape. He is also a skilled acrobat and hand-to-hand combatant. Mandrill has above normal intelligence and is a gifted planner and strategist. In at least one instance, the Mandrill used technological means to alter and augment his power so that the sight of him mesmerized the male Thing.

In other media

Television
 Mandrill appears in The Avengers: Earth's Mightiest Heroes, voiced by Fred Tatasciore. In the episode "The Man in the Anthill", he is shown as an inmate of the Big House. In the episode "The Breakout, Part 1", Mandrill is among the inmates that escape when a mass-breakout occurs. In the episode "Some Assembly Required", the Avengers easily capture Mandrill following his attempted bank robbery. As of the episode "The Man Who Stole Tomorrow", Mandrill was imprisoned at Prison 42.
 Mandrill appears in the M.O.D.O.K. episode "If Saturday Be... For the Boys!", voiced by Kevin Michael Richardson. This version is in a relationship with Armadillo's ex-wife and has large genitalia, which is comically censored.

Video games
Mandrill appears in Marvel: Avengers Alliance. He is killed by the Circle of Eight.

References

External links
 Mandrill on the Marvel Universe Character Bio Wiki
 MarvelDirectory.com's article on Mandrill
 

Comics characters introduced in 1973
Characters created by Ross Andru
Characters created by Steve Gerber
Fictional characters from New Mexico
Fictional private military members
Fictional rapists
Marvel Comics characters who can move at superhuman speeds
Marvel Comics characters with superhuman strength
Marvel Comics military personnel
Marvel Comics mutants
Marvel Comics supervillains
Polygamy in fiction